BHR may refer to:

 Bahrain (ISO 3166-1 alpha-3 code: BHR), a small Arab monarchy in the Persian Gulf
 BHR Partners, Chinese-American private equity company
 Birmingham Hip Resurfacing (BHR) system, an FDA-approved device for hip resurfacing
 Blue House raid, an unsuccessful attempt by North Korean commandos to assassinate the South Korean president
 Bronchial hyperresponsiveness, a state characterised by easily triggered bronchospasm
 Business History Review, a peer-reviewed academic journal covering the field of business history
 IATA code for Bharatpur Airport